General elections were held in the Northern Mariana Islands in 2012 to elect three members of the Senate, the House of Representatives, municipal councils, the Board of Education and the Islands' representative of the US Congress, as well as to vote on three referendums and on whether judges should remain in post.

Results

Delegate to the US Congress

Senate

House of Representatives

Board of Education

Judges

References

2012 elections in Oceania
2012 in the Northern Mariana Islands
2012 Northern Mariana Islands elections